The Estrella Damm Ladies Open is a professional golf tournament on the Ladies European Tour, first played in 2017. 

The tournament is played in Spain at Club de Golf Terramar, southwest of Barcelona. It was the first Ladies European Tour event held in Europe in the 2017 season. The primary sponsor is S.A. Damm, brewers of Estrella Damm beer.

Winners

References

External links

Ladies European Tour
Club de Golf Terramar

Mediterranean Ladies Open
Golf tournaments in Spain